Frank Haigh is a former professional rugby league footballer who played in the 1950s and 1960s.

Playing career

County Cup Final appearances
Frank Haigh played right-, i.e. number 10, in Wakefield Trinity's 23–5 victory over Hunslet in the 1956–57 Yorkshire County Cup Final during the 1956–57 season at Headingley Stadium on Saturday 20 October 1956.

Notable tour matches
Frank Haigh played right-, i.e. number 10, in Wakefield Trinity’s 17-12 victory over Australia in the 1956–57 Kangaroo tour of Great Britain and France match at Belle Vue, Wakefield on Monday 10 December 1956.

References

External links
Search for "Haigh" at rugbyleagueproject.org

Place of birth missing (living people)
Rugby league props
Wakefield Trinity players
Keighley Cougars players
Year of birth missing (living people)
Living people
English rugby league players